Eußerthal is a municipality in the Südliche Weinstraße district of Rhineland-Palatinate, Germany.

References

Municipalities in Rhineland-Palatinate
Palatinate Forest
Südliche Weinstraße